The European Chapter on Combinatorial Optimization (also, EURO Working Group on Combinatorial Optimization, or EWG ECCO) 
is a working group whose objective is to promote original research in the field of combinatorial optimization at the 
European level.

History 
ECCO is one of the working groups of EURO, the Association of European Operational Research Societies. 
The Group was founded in 1987 by Catherine Roucairol, Alexander Rinnooy Kan, and Dominique de Werra.

Governance 
The group is managed by an Advisory Board of 4 members and a Coordinator. The Advisory Board is currently composed of Jacek Błażewicz,
Van Dat Cung, Alain Hertz, and Paolo Toth. The current coordinator is Silvano Martello.

Membership 
The group is suitable for people who are presently engaged in Combinatorial Optimization, either in theoretical aspects or in business, 
industry or public administration applications. Currently (2022), the group has over 1,600 members from 75 countries.

Conferences 

ECCO holds conferences on a regular basis (once a year during Spring). An abstract booklet is distributed to the participants at each 
meeting.

Publications 
In most cases, the annual conference is followed by a peer reviewed special issue of an international journal, presenting a selection 
of the contributions presented at the meeting. Recent special issues appeared on Annals of Operations Research 
, 
Optimization,   
Journal of Scheduling, 
Discrete Applied Mathematics,
and Journal of Combinatorial Optimization.

A newsletter is emailed to all members every three months.

References

External links
 
 
 
 
 
 
 
 

Combinatorial optimization
Working groups
Organizations established in 1987